Amitzur Shapira (9 July 1932 – 6 September 1972) was an Israeli sprinter and long jumper. He was head coach for the Israeli track and field team at the 1972 Summer Olympics in Munich, Germany. He was murdered by Palestinian terrorists in the Munich massacre.

Biography

Amitzur Shapira was born in Mandatory Palestine and was a resident in Herzliya. For many years, he served as a teacher and educator at the Wingate Institute. Shapira was married with four children.

Shapira attended the 1972 Summer Olympics as the head coach for the Israeli track and field team. During the event he and 10 other members of the Israel Olympic team were taken hostage by Arab terrorists. Two of the Israeli hostages were shot at the beginning of the ordeal and the other nine (including Shapira) were murdered on the tarmac of Furstenfeldbruck airbase during a botched rescue attempt by Munich police and Bavarian border guards.

Shapira was the coach of Esther Shachamarov who later became an Israeli Olympic athlete (in 1976, she became the first Israeli to reach an Olympic final).  When she heard that her coach had been murdered she withdrew from the 1972 Olympics.

Shapira was buried in Kiryat Shaul Cemetery in Tel Aviv.

His grandson is the German artist and comedian Shahak Shapira.

References

Further reading
 Reeve, Simon: One day in September. The full story of the 1972 Munich Olympics massacre and the Israeli revenge operation "Wrath of God". Arcade, New York 2000. .

1932 births
1972 deaths
Sportspeople from Tel Aviv
20th-century Israeli Jews
Israeli male sprinters
Israeli athletics coaches
Jewish male athletes (track and field)
Victims of the Munich massacre
Deaths by firearm in Germany
Academic staff of Wingate Institute
Burials at Kiryat Shaul Cemetery